Kylie Anne Foy (born 30 December 1971, in Auckland, New Zealand) is a former field hockey striker from New Zealand, who finished sixth with her national team at the 2000 Summer Olympics in Sydney. Foy also competed with The Black Sticks at the 1992 Summer Olympics in Barcelona.

References

External links
 

New Zealand female field hockey players
Olympic field hockey players of New Zealand
Field hockey players at the 1992 Summer Olympics
Field hockey players at the 2000 Summer Olympics
Field hockey players from Auckland
1971 births
Living people
20th-century New Zealand women